The RP MALL  is a shopping mall in the city of Kollam, Kerala, owned by one of the business tycoons in India, B. Ravi Pillai's RP Group. The Mall is located on Kollam's high street. RP Mall was formerly known as K-Mall (Kollam Mall)  .

There is a  McDonald's restaurant.

References

Shopping malls in Kerala
Shopping malls in Kollam
2012 establishments in Kerala
Buildings and structures in Kollam
Shopping malls established in 2012
Tourist attractions in Kollam